Nasir Jalil (1955 – 8 June 2011) was a footballer who represented Singapore at international level in the late 1970s and early 1980s.

Nicknamed The Crazy Horse, he is remembered for scoring the late equaliser in the Malaysia Cup final in 1977 at the Merdeka Stadium when he won the first of his two Malaysia Cups. His second Malaysia Cup triumph came in 1980.

He next played for Terengganu from 1982 to 1988, finishing his football career with Balestier Central the same year. Subsequently, he became a Malaysian citizen and lived in Terengganu for the rest of his life.

Personal life
On 8 June 2011, Nasir died of brain cancer, first diagnosed in 2003, at the age of 56.

His brother Nasaruddin Jalil also represented Singapore at international level. Nasir's daughter Siti Rahmah is a silat athlete for Malaysia.

References

External links

Nasir Jalil biography at Singapore Infopedia

1955 births
2011 deaths
Singaporean footballers
Singapore international footballers

Association footballers not categorized by position